Silvana Grasso (Macchia di Giarre, 3 June 1952) is an Italian writer.

Biography

Her books have been translated into English, Greek, German, Danish; while her plays have been performed in several Italian cities, and in France and Spain. She was an assessor for the Beni Culturali for the Comune di Catania (2007-2008), where she carried out the project "Una cultura da Castello", aimed at bringing attention to and renovating the Castello Ursino.

Works

Stories
 I scuti di Santa Nicola, in "Paragone - Letteratura", XLI, n.s., 21 (484), giugno 1990.
 Nebbia di "ddraunàra", in "Paragone - Letteratura", XLII, n.s., 29 (500), febbraio 1991.
 Ovvero del Sublime, in «Nuove Effemeridi», a. IV n. 15, 1991/III.
 Nebbie di ddraunàra, Milano, La Tartaruga, 1993.
 7 uomini 7. Peripezie di una vedova, Palermo, Flaccovio, 2006; a cura di Marco Bardini, Pisa, ETS, 2018.
 Pazza è la luna, Torino, Einaudi, 2007.
 Il cuore a destra, Valverde, Le Farfalle, 2014.
 Una imperfetta felicità, in la Repubblica (Palermo edition), with illustrations by Franco Donarelli, published in 10 installments in the Sunday edition between 7 July 2019 and 8 September 2019.

Novels
 Il Bastardo di Mautàna, Milano, Anabasi, 1994; finalist for the :it:Premio Bergamo (letteratura) Milano, Club degli Editori, 1995; Torino, Einaudi, 1997; con una postfazione di Marina Castiglione, Venezia, Marsilio, 2011.
 Translations: H παρακμή των βερντεράμε, Athína, Ekdotikos Oikos A. A. Livani, 1996; The Bastard of Mautana, London, Faber & Faber, 1996; De bastaard van Mautana, Amsterdam, De Bezige Bij, 1996; Der Bastard von Mautana, Berlin, Berlin Verlag, 1998.
 Ninna nanna del lupo, Torino, Einaudi, 1995; Venezia, Marsilio, 2012.
 L’albero di Giuda, Torino, Einaudi, 1997; Venezia, Marsilio, 2011.
 La pupa di zucchero, Milano, Rizzoli, 2001; with a preface by Gandolfo Cascio, Venezia, Marsilio/Universale Feltrinelli, 2019.
 Disìo, Milano, Rizzoli, 2005; with a preface by Marco Bardini, Venezia, Marsilio/Universale Feltrinelli, 2019.
 L’incantesimo della buffa, Venezia, Marsilio, 2011.
 Solo se c’è la Luna, Venezia, Marsilio, 2017.
 La domenica vestivi di rosso, Venezia, Marsilio, 2018.

Poetry
 Enrichetta sul Corso, with drawings by Aldo Turiano and Fabio Nicola Grosso, acqueforti di Fabio Nicola Grosso, Catania, OBI (Orizzonti Bibliofilia Italiana), 2001.
 Enrichetta, bilingual Italian-Dutch edition, edited by Gandolfo Cascio, translation by Raniero Speelman, introduction by Marina Castiglione, Amsterdam, Istituto Italiano di Cultura, 2017.
 Me pudet. Poesie 1994-2017, critical edition edited by Gandolfo Cascio, Pisa, ETS, 2019.

Theater
 La notte di San Giovanni, radiodrama, Radio RAI.
 L’ombra del gelsomino, radiodrama, Radio RAI.
 Manca solo la domenica, pièce tratta da Pazza è la luna, by and with Licia Maglietta, produced by :it:Teatri Uniti.
 Il difficile mestiere di vedova, directed by Licia Maglietta, produced by :it:Teatri Uniti.
 Atthis. Dell’Eterna Ferita, edited by Gandolfo Cascio, Giarre, Archivio Silvana Grasso, 2017.

Translations
 :it:Archestrato di Gela, I piaceri della mensa, Palermo, Flaccovio, 1987.
 :it:Matrone di Pitane, Un banchetto attico, Palermo, Flaccovio, 1988.
 :it:Galeno, La dieta dimagrante, Palermo, Flaccovio, 1989.
 :it:Eroda, Mimiambi. Commediole del III sec. a. C., Palermo, Flaccovio, 1989.

Recognition
 1993: Premio Grinzane Cavour "Giovane Autore Esordiente"
 1993: :it:Premio Mondello
 1995: Il timone d’argento
 1996: :it:Premio nazionale letterario Pisa
 1997: Premio Vittorini
 1997: :it:Premio internazionale Sileno d'oro
 1998: Premio Vir Singulari Virtude
 1999: Premio Città di Monreale per la Narrativa
 2002: Premio Flaiano of literature, with La pupa di zucchero
 2002: Premio Grazia Deledda
 2002: Premio Brancati for La pupa di zucchero
 2003: Rotary Club - Terra d’Agavi
 2004: Premio Rubens
 2006: Premio Grinzane Cavour
 2011: Premio Comune di Gela
 2016: Premio Aci Galatea
 2018: Premio Maria Teresa Di Lascia
 2018: Premio Telamone per la Cultura
 2019: Premio Sant’Alfio Fonte di Pace
 2019: Premio Rocco Federico alla carriera
 2019: Premio Luigi Pirandello

Notes

Monographs
 Marina Castiglione, L’incesto della parola. Lingua e stile in Silvana Grasso, Caltanissetta- Roma, Sciascia, 2009.
 Gandolfo Cascio (edited by), Vetrine di cristallo. Saggi su Silvana Grasso, Venezia, Marsilio, 2018.

External links
 Works by Silvana Grasso, on Open Library, Internet Archive.

1952 births
20th-century Italian writers
20th-century Italian women writers
Living people